The diaphysis is the main or midsection (shaft) of a long bone. It is made up of cortical bone and usually contains bone marrow and adipose tissue (fat).

It is a middle tubular part composed of compact bone which surrounds a central marrow cavity which contains red or yellow marrow. In diaphysis, primary ossification occurs.

Ewing sarcoma tends to occur at the diaphysis.

Additional images

See also
Epiphysis
Metaphysis

References

Skeletal system
Long bones